Daltopora sinanensis is a moth of the family Gelechiidae. It was described by Sakamaki in 1995. It is found in Korea, Japan and the Russian Far East.

The wingspan is 11-11.1 mm. The forewings are brownish fuscous, with an obscure discal stigma and two obscure ochreous blotches, one on the costa at the apical one-fourth and the other on the tornus. The hindwings are greyish-fuscous, becoming darker towards apex.

References

Moths described in 1995
Isophrictini